Greater Kashmir is an English daily newspaper printed and published from Srinagar, the summer capital of Jammu and Kashmir. The newspaper initially began its edition in 1987 as a weekly newspaper and later, started its first daily publication in 1989.

The Greater Kashmir has its largest base of circulation in Jammu and Kashmir, and is the most widely read English daily newspaper in the state.  The Greater Kashmir group (GK Communications Pvt. Ltd) also publishes its sister projects in Urdu language – Nawa-e-Jhelum and Kashmir Uzma – and the English-language magazine Kashmir Ink.

As of 2018, Greater Kashmir is being published from Srinagar and Jammu at the price of Rs. 5 per copy. Its editor-in-chief is Fayaz Ahmad Kaloo. Greater Kashmir lately started Kashmir Ink, a weekly magazine featuring Kashmir's artists, poets and also writing many soft stories. The executive editor of Kashmir Ink is Ahaya Fayaz. The newspaper also launched its Endeavor Page, in which several start-ups in Jammu and Kashmir region are featured.

Advertisement controversy
In February 2019, the Governor's office indefinitely stopped giving government ads to this paper as well as to the Kashmir Reader. The Kashmir Editors Guild decried this as an attempt to curb the freedom of the press in India. However the government ads were restored to Greater Kashmir later on.

References

External links
 

1987 establishments in Jammu and Kashmir
Daily newspapers published in India
English-language newspapers published in India
Mass media in Jammu and Kashmir
Newspapers established in 1987